The following is the mountains in South Korea by height.

See also 
 List of mountains in Korea

References 
 Books
 
 Websites

Korea